= Cystatin-F =

Protein-coding gene in humans

CST7
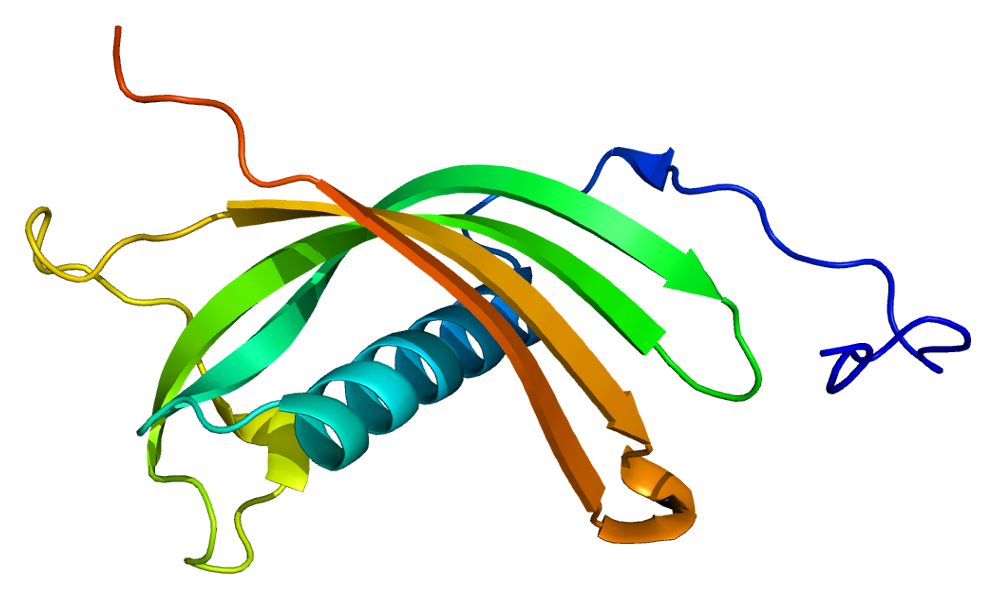

Identifiers
- Aliases: CST7, CMAP, cystatin F
- External IDs: OMIM: 603253; MGI: 1298217; GeneCards: CST7
Available structures
PDB	Ortholog search: PDBe RCSB
PDB	List of PDB id codes 2CH9

Gene location (Human)
Chr.	Chromosome 20 (human)
Band	20p11.21	Start	24,949,269 bp
Band	20p11.21	End	24,959,928 bp

Gene location (Mouse)
Chr.	Chromosome 2 (mouse)
Band	2|2 G3	Start	150,412,335 bp
Band	2|2 G3	End	150,420,864 bp
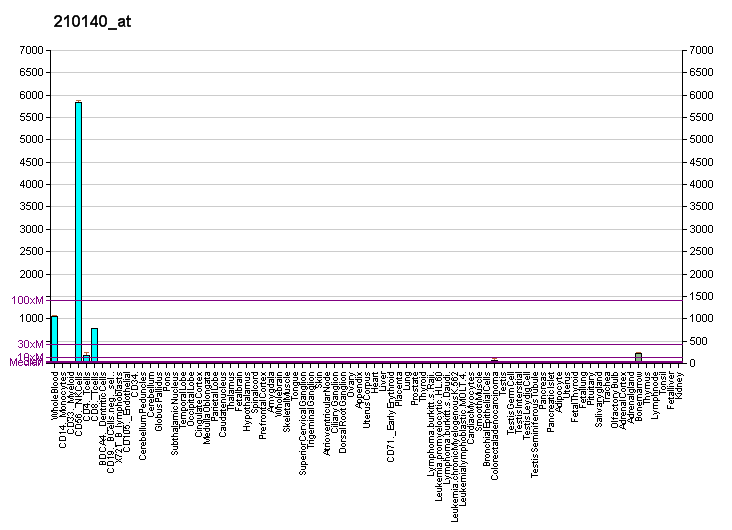
RNA expression pattern
Bgee	Human / Mouse (ortholog); Top expressed in: granulocyte; blood; bone marrow; bone marrow cell; trabecular bone; spleen; right lung; gonad; upper lobe of left lung; lymph node / Top expressed in: mesenteric lymph nodes; granulocyte; morula; tibiofemoral joint; bone marrow; blood; spleen; fetal liver hematopoietic progenitor cell; thymus; decidua; More reference expression data
BioGPS	More reference expression data
Gene ontology
Molecular function	peptidase inhibitor activity; endopeptidase inhibitor activity; protein binding; protease binding; cysteine-type endopeptidase inhibitor activity; protein homodimerization activity
Cellular component	cytoplasm; extracellular region; extracellular space; lysosome; endosome; late endosome; multivesicular body; endoplasmic reticulum; Golgi apparatus; cytoplasmic vesicle
Biological process	negative regulation of peptidase activity; immune response; negative regulation of cysteine-type endopeptidase activity; negative regulation of endopeptidase activity; positive regulation of myelination; inhibition of cysteine-type endopeptidase activity; negative regulation of microglial cell activation
Sources:Amigo / QuickGO
Orthologs
Databases	NCBI: entry; OMA: entry
Species	Human	Mouse
Entrez	8530	13011
Ensembl	ENSG00000077984	ENSMUSG00000068129
UniProt	O76096	O89098
RefSeq (mRNA)	NM_003650	NM_009977
RefSeq (protein)	NP_003641	NP_034107
Location (UCSC)	Chr 20: 24.95 – 24.96 Mb	Chr 2: 150.41 – 150.42 Mb
PubMed search
- Wikidata
View/Edit Human	View/Edit Mouse

Cystatin-F is a protein that in humans is encoded by the CST7 gene.

The cystatin superfamily encompasses proteins that contain multiple cystatin-like sequences. Some of the members are active cysteine protease inhibitors, while others have lost or perhaps never acquired this inhibitory activity. There are three inhibitory families in the superfamily, including the type 1 cystatins (stefins), type 2 cystatins and the kininogens. The type 2 cystatin proteins are a class of cysteine proteinase inhibitors found in a variety of human fluids and secretions. This gene encodes a glycosylated cysteine protease inhibitor with a putative role in immune regulation through inhibition of a unique target in the hematopoietic system. Expression of the protein has been observed in various human cancer cell lines established from malignant tumors.
